The Yu-Gi-Oh! series features an extensive cast of characters created by Kazuki Takahashi. The series takes place in a fictional city in Japan called Domino City, in which most of the characters that appear in the series originate. Many plot elements are also influenced by Egypt and Egyptian mythology, and as such, Egyptian characters also appear within the story.

The original manga of Yu-Gi-Oh! tells the tale of Yugi Mutou, a timid young boy who loves all sorts of games, but is often bullied around. One day, he solves an ancient artifact known as the Millennium Puzzle, causing his body to play host to a mysterious spirit with the personality of a gambler. From that moment onwards, whenever Yugi or one of his friends is threatened by those with darkness in their hearts, this "Dark Yugi" shows himself and challenges them to dangerous "Shadow Games" which reveal the true nature of someone's heart, the losers of these contests often being subjected to a dark punishment called a "Penalty Game". As the series progresses, Yugi and his friends (Katsuya Jonouchi, Anzu Mazaki, Hiroto Honda, Miho Nosaka (in the 1998 series), and later Ryo Bakura) learn that this other Yugi inside of his puzzle is actually the spirit of a nameless Pharaoh from Egyptian times who had lost his memories. As Yugi and his companions attempted to help the Pharaoh regain his memories, they find themselves going through many trials as they wager their lives facing off against others that wield the mysterious Millennium Items and the dark power of the Shadow Games.

The Japanese names in Western order (given name before family name) and English manga names are listed first and the English anime names are listed second, when applicable.

Main characters

One of the main protagonists of the story alongside Dark Yugi. He fears the other personality inside him at first; however, as the narrative progresses, he grows a strong bond with his other self and considers his other soul a close and valuable friend. Several defining character moments for him was when he defeats antagonists without Dark Yugi's help in games under bleak circumstances, proving that he is truly worthy of being chosen by the Millennium Puzzle to complete it and be the Pharaoh's vessel.

One of the main protagonists of the story alongside Yugi. Dark Yugi is the titular character holding the title Yūgiō (遊戯王; lit. Game King) and the owner of the Millennium Puzzle (or Pendant as it is originally known as) as the Pharaoh. He is a savvy invincible games player who plays many different games to defeat his opponents and gives them a Penalty Game as punishment after defeating them or when they cheat. Whenever Yugi or his friends are in danger, he comes out of the Puzzle to protect them. As the story progresses, he meets his eventual rival, Seto Kaiba. He defeats Kaiba in their first battle in school and later during Death-T. He gives Kaiba the "Experience of Death" and "Mind Crush" Penalty Game, respectively, after both duels. He meets other Millennium Item wielders such as Shadi and Dark Bakura and faces them in dark games and coming out victorious.

At the start of the Duelist Kingdom arc, he faces Pegasus in a video tape duel with a timer. Just as Dark Yugi was about to win, the timer expired causing him to lose. In order to get Dark Yugi to come to Duelist Kingdom, Pegasus takes Sugoroku's soul and places it in a tape. The next day, while in class, Yugi told the others that Dark Yugi was depressed. He was so depressed that Yugi suddenly got up from his chair and was walking out of the class, but was stopped by Anzu asking where he was going. Yugi stated that Dark Yugi wanted to be alone. On the roof, Dark Yugi started yelling and punching the fence. He blamed himself for getting Sugoroku getting his soul taken. He resolved him then stated he will defeat Pegasus to save Sugoroku. After facing many opponents on the island, Dark Yugi faces Kaiba again. The both bet five star chips. The winner enters the castle. In this duel, they used Kaiba's new prototype Duel Disk. After overcoming Kaiba's Blue-Eyes Ultimate Dragon, Kaiba resorts to a suicide attempt in order to win the game. If Dark Yugi attacks, it will lead to Kaiba's death. Dark Yugi hesitates, but then remembers Sugoroku and that he has to save him. Dark Yugi attacks Kaiba to win the game, but Yugi comes out and stops the attack, resulting in a loss. After Kaiba enters the castle, Mai appears and learns what happened. She earned extra star chips in attempt to pay Dark Yugi back for saving her. Yugi accepts the star chips and they head into the castle. After beating Mai and Jonouchi beating Keith, it was time for Dark Yugi and Jonouchi to face each other, but Jonouchi stated that he felt like defeating Keith was his final battle of Duelist Kingdom. Dark Yugi stated that it wouldn't be necessary because their objective is to defeat Pegasus. Dueling in front of Pegasus would only expose more of their tactics, which would only hurt them. Dark Yugi asks Jonouchi if he would it leave it to him. Jonouchi states that he has the better chance of winning against Pegasus. He gives Dark Yugi his prize card. During the battle with Pegasus, Yugi is finally able to talk to Dark Yugi. They come up with the "Mind Shuffle" tactic to stop Pegasus from reading their minds. It works and Pegasus is forced to start a dark game and the requirement is that only those chosen by the Millennium Items can endure it. As Yugi is just a normal person not chosen by the Puzzle, he is affected by the dark game eventually causing him to collapse, but not before setting one final card. Dark Yugi takes over and with the help of Yugi and his friends blocking the powers of the Eye, Dark Yugi is able to come out victorious. Now that Pegasus has been defeated, Dark Yugi demanded that Pegasus release the souls of everyone he took. After that, Pegasus tells Dark Yugi that the Items have an evil intelligence in them, which gets Dark Yugi's attention. Dark Yugi then demanded Pegasus to explain how he got the Millennium Eye or else he'd send him to oblivion. After Pegasus explains his backstory, the scene shifts to Dark Yugi questioning who he is. Jonouchi states that Dark Yugi doesn't seem happy about beating Pegasus and that he didn't give him the usual Penalty Game. Anzu states that he couldn't because if he did, it would prove Pegasus right about being an evil intelligence. Later, Kaiba appears from the castle and states that Mokuba was the final piece... maybe the Puzzle of his heart is now complete. Yugi reassures Dark Yugi that it doesn't matter where he came from, only that he's here and he's means a lot to them. Kaiba tells Yugi to "tell the other Yugi that our battle isn't over yet".

Yugi's close friend. Jonouchi is loyal, heroic, good-natured, brave, funny, friendly, kind-hearted, and loving. When Ushio beats up Jonouchi and Honda, Yugi stands up for them, and it's then that Jonouchi realizes that he was jealous of Yugi's "treasure" all along. Later on that night, he retrieves the last Millennium Puzzle piece and brings it back to Yugi's house, where Yugi completes it and challenges Ushio to the first Shadow Game of the series. Jonouchi is touched by Yugi's behavior towards him and they become loyal friends, forming his own "treasure."

Jonouchi is great at fist fighting and is usually able to take on people bigger than him, such as Bandit Keith (in the second anime, Jonouchi loses in the fight with Keith) and handicapping himself against people like Bruce Ryu. Though not exactly the best gamer in Domino, he develops a better liking to them thanks to Yugi, and he's managed to use his strong points to help Yugi come through in earlier story lines. Later on, he develops an interest in the Duel Monsters game, the latest fad at the time. Though unskilled at first, with Yugi's help, he trains for the Duelist Kingdom tournament for his sister and participates in the Battle City tournament because he thinks Kaiba is plotting something and he has to stop him (referencing DEATH-T); progressively getting better throughout the series to the point where he could be called a true duelist and earn the right to duel Dark Yugi. Jonouchi is shown to have a very kind heart, be selfless and caring, considerate, and eager willingness to help and save those he deeply cares for and loves, but he also demonstrates a near lack of modesty and can be rather rash at times, making him a source of comic relief. He's a fan of porn and lets Yugi borrow his porno tape until his player gets fixed. He also has an extreme fear of ghosts, mummies, and anything else that could be considered 'creepy'. Jonouchi notes that, before he met Yugi, he was never really motivated for anything. As the story progressed, he learned to channel his anger into games instead of his fists.

Yugi's childhood best friend and an extremely supportive girl with a lot of spirit for her friends, who has a crush on Atem. Anzu is not an avid game-player and her ability is well below that of Yugi, though she exhibits some knowledge of video game RPGs during the Monster World arc. Her dueling ability is decent and she used to defeat Jonouchi in school before he became a seasoned duelist. She is athletic, has a strong school spirit, and secretly worked at a fast food restaurant called Burger World to save money; her secret dream is to be a professional dancer in the USA. When Yugi and Jonouchi find out about these secrets when they follow her (thinking she is taking part in Enjo kōsai), she gains a new respect for Jonouchi and her childhood friend, who are more than willing to support her dream and keep her secret.

Honda, who is in class 1-B at Domino High School, is a boy who became a friend of Yugi, Jonouchi, and Anzu. Later on, he becomes a friend to Bakura as well. In the manga, Honda starts out as Jonouchi's street thug buddy and also (at first) has a crush on Miho Nosaka. In the 1998 anime, he is the head of the school's beautician department. Along with Jonouchi, he was saved from the bully Ushio by Yugi, though he still dislikes Yugi at first. After admitting his love for Miho Nosaka to Jonouchi, he is convinced by him to ask Yugi for his help in writing a love letter to her in the form of a puzzle. When the vain teacher Ms. Chono confiscated the puzzle, threatening to punish Miho if the secret admirer does not come clean, Yugi and Jonouchi stood up for him by saying they were the ones who wrote it. Ms. Chono decides to put together the puzzle to find out who the sender is anyway, and Dark Yugi secretly turns it into a Shadow Game, shattering Ms. Chono's pretty face as the Penalty Game. From then on, Honda warms up to Yugi and becomes one of his dearest friends, despite the fact that Miho later turns him down when he asks her out directly.

In the 1998 anime Honda has a recurring crush on Miho, but he does not have involvement with Ms. Chono.

In the English version of the Duel Monsters anime, his past was heavily edited, to remove the violent fighting bits, and his importance is slightly down-played. In the Duel Monsters anime, he has a large crush on Jonouchi's sister Shizuka and his origin story with Miho is never mentioned. He also has a strong rivalry in the English version with Duke Devlin and regularly competes with him for Serenity's affections.

A transfer student (British in 4Kids' portrayal) who becomes friends with the main group of the story. Like Yugi, he is also interested in games, particularly tabletop role-playing games like . Before he is introduced to the story, he was constantly moving schools and isolating himself due to the fact that, every time he played a game with his friends, his friends would end up in a coma. This is revealed to be Dark Bakura inflicting Penalty Games on them, which trapped their souls into RPG miniature figures. Together with Yugi and his friends, they join forces to crush Dark Bakura in a Shadow Game of Monster World. From then on, the normal Bakura joins the main group in many of their conflicts. Despite the danger, Bakura continues to hold onto the Millennium Ring, remaining deeply curious about its history. This, along with his trusting and innocent nature, sometimes brings him into conflict with the others and also allows Dark Bakura to continually possess him without his knowledge. Prior to meeting Yugi and his friends, Bakura's mother and his sister, Amane, died in a car accident. (This detail is omitted from the second series.) Bakura misses Amane very much, and often writes letters to her in heaven. The first animated series also included the character Miho Nosaka, who had a crush on Bakura. In the Yu-Gi-Oh! Duel Monsters anime, his role in the group is greatly reduced compared to the manga, as he is mostly being controlled by Dark Bakura and doesn't accompany Yugi and his friends as much as he did in the manga, and is excluded from filler arcs. In addition, he is introduced in the middle of the Duelist Kingdom story as someone they merely knew from school, as opposed to being a close friend, and his love for tabletop role-playing games and making occult decks has been greatly written out.

The current President and CEO of the Kaiba Corporation, Kaiba was first introduced as a prodigious, cold-hearted gamer who stopped at nothing to achieve his goals, even resorting to seemingly killing his opponents. He lived a bad childhood because of his good for nothing stepfather. When Kaiba learned that Yugi's grandfather possesses a "Blue-Eyes White Dragon" card, he steals the card from Yugi, ends up dueling Yami Yugi, and lost. Yami Yugi gave Kaiba the "Experience of Death" Penalty Game. Since his defeat to Yami Yugi, Kaiba, unable to forget the Penalty Game he experienced, was planning DEATH-T to exact revenge and kill him. Kaiba duels Yami Yugi again and loses. Yami Yugi gives Kaiba the "Mind Crush" Penalty Game to momentarily shatter Kaiba's heart to purge it of his evil, which causes Kaiba to end up in a coma for almost a year. Though reformed, Kaiba retains his arrogance and rivalry with Yami Yugi by telling Yugi to "tell the other Yugi that our battle isn't over" at the end of Duelist Kingdom. While Kaiba leaves the story following the Battle City arc, he appears in the anime adaption as a major character and has been mentioned in sequel Yu-Gi-Oh! GX series as the founder of Duel Academy.
Kaiba created Solid Vision in the original manga during the events of DEATH-T and further expanded on it during the story and in the sequel manga and movie Transcend Game and Dark Side of Dimensions, respectively. Kaiba attempted to bring back Atem to settle things between them, which causes much of the storyline to occur before he departed to the afterlife after Atem. Kaiba uses a Blue-Eyes deck and his ace monster is Blue-Eyes White Dragon.

In the manga, Mokuba is characterized as a spoiled brat, always trying to trick Yugi Muto to get back at him for defeating his older brother. In Yu-Gi-Oh! Duel Monsters, Mokuba is eternally devoted to his brother Seto Kaiba and is constantly by his side. He is not as violent as his manga counterpart, and is not committed to avenge Seto's defeat. He befriends Yugi's group after they rescue him, thus making him the warmer, more sociable one of the two brothers.

A one-shot minor character in the manga, who was re-written as a main character for the 1998 Toei anime adaptation. Here, she is a very good friend of Yugi and the best friend of Anzu. This version of Miho is a cheerful, kind, and caring girly girl who loves all things that are cute, her friends, and is one of the school's treasures (according to Honda). Miho tends to talk in third person and has gotten crushes on many of the male cast members throughout the show (particularly ones she deems cool) but is not interested in Honda in any way other than as a friend (whereas he is madly in love with her). Miho has a stubborn side, and whenever her friends are threatened, she will not hesitate to get serious and do whatever she can to protect them like when Warashibe poisons Anzu, Honda, and Jonouchi. While Miho is overall sweet and innocent, she is shown to be smarter than she lets on and has a manipulative side to her and is not above letting her desires be known in front of Honda, who she knows has a huge crush for her. This includes him waiting in line to buy her a collectible watch, waiting in line for perfume, and making it sound like she was considering taking him on a trip with her if he won her a digital pets contest. While this would imply a lack of care for Honda, Miho is shown to love him dearly (just not in a romantic way) as when she thought he'd died she began sobbing uncontrollably and resolved to fight for his sake. When she finds out he is alive, she teams up with Jonouchi to fight against Ryuichi and Aileen who were keeping Honda and Yugi's grandfather captive.

Antagonists

The main antagonist of the series. He is a dark spirit dwelling inside of the Millennium Ring, Dark Bakura seeks the Millennium items to open the Door of Darkness, which grants evil power to anyone that opens it. To do so, he takes control over Bakura's body against Bakura's will, since he doesn't have a body of his own. In the beginning of the story, he torments Bakura by taking over his body whenever he played a game with his friends and used Penalty Games to trap their souls into TRPG miniatures for the Monster World game, causing Bakura to constantly transfer schools. With the help of Yugi and Yugi's other self, Jonouchi, Anzu, and Honda (and Miho in the 1998 anime), they were able to temporarily purge Dark Bakura's influence on their friend by defeating the final boss of Monster World, . However, later on when the group is seemingly going to be trapped within the labyrinth below Duelist Kingdom, the spirit's voice within the Millennium Ring tricks Bakura into putting it on again, assuring Bakura that his other half will help save his friends and that the dark spirit has undergone a change of heart. With Bakura's friends unaware that he had once again put on the Millennium Ring, Dark Bakura helps Yami Yugi in his game designed to outwit the Meikyuu Brothers' trickery and they head to the surface.

For a while in the manga, it was unknown whether or not Dark Bakura was still a malevolent spirit. On one hand, he occasionally helped Yugi and his friends, trying to gain their uneasy trust and seemed to allow Bakura more free control of his body compared to his earlier treatment of his host (who was still unaware of what transpires whenever his other half took over). On the other hand, unbeknownst to the others, he is shown to be the one that killed Pegasus by tearing the Millennium Eye out of his eye socket and taking it for himself, licking the leftover blood. Unbeknownst to Bakura, throughout the later portion of the manga, his other self will occasionally take over his body whenever he sees the chance of furthering his own selfish goals. During the final arc, Dark Bakura is revealed to be an entity created when the soul of  merged with a fragment of the great evil god Zorc Necrophades after both were sealed inside the Millennium Ring. He is defeated for good when Yami Yugi/Atem summons Horakthy, the Creator of Light to destroy Zorc (in the anime, Dark Bakura became a part of Zorc and was destroyed by Horakthy, while in the manga, his life was linked to Akhenaden's and Zorc's and was killed when both of them died).

/ Dameon Clarke (English)
He is known in the English manga as "Maximillion J. Pegasus"
The eccentric American Chairman of Industrial Illusions (shortened to I²) and the creator of the game  (originally ). In the original manga, it's his story about meeting Shadi and the supposed "evil intelligence" of the Millennium Items that prompts Yami Yugi's search for the answer of who he is and where he came from. During his final Shadow Game with Yugi/Dark Yugi, he tells them of his discovery of an ancient Egyptian Shadow Game during his travels in the Valley of the Kings, which inspired his creation of Duel Monsters and the creation of card games in general, such as tarot cards. In the second anime, as the creator of the card game Duel Monsters and the discoverer of their ancient Egyptian roots, Pegasus often plays a key role due to his extensive knowledge of the game and its mysterious origins. He has a habit of calling Yugi Mutou "Yugi-boy" and Seto Kaiba "Kaiba-boy". This trend continues in the Yu-Gi-Oh! GX anime, calling Judai Yuki "Judai-boy". Pegasus often uses English words interspliced with Japanese, including English words like "goodness gracious!" and "snap!" and using the English pronoun "you" instead of Japanese second-person words. His speech is also unique in terms of pronunciation. In both English and Japanese he tends to elongate vowel sounds, especially near the end of a sentence.

Pegasus quickly establishes himself as the manga's fourth main antagonist (and the second anime adaptation's first main antagonist), challenging Yugi to a Shadow Game in order to force him to come to his tournament  and face him, taking the soul of his grandfather Sugoroku Mutou as a Penalty Game for losing the timed match to ensure this. Throughout the battles to get to Pegasus' castle, Yugi is seen talking to his grandfather through the use of a camcorder. In the second anime, he traps Sugoroku in a Soul Prison Duel Monsters card. Pegasus also kidnaps Mokuba to convince his brother Seto Kaiba to come as well, later capturing their souls as well. Through a series of flashbacks, Pegasus is revealed to have had a lover, who died after her 17th birthday (she dies after their marriage in the anime). Although the exact details vary from medium to medium, his actions were all carried out in the hopes of resurrecting her. He is eventually defeated in a final game of Duel Monsters by Yugi and Dark Yugi at the end of the arc, and is obliged to release his victims' souls. He is murdered soon after by Dark Bakura and his millennium item is taken. In the Duel Monsters anime, he isn't killed by Dark Bakura's attack and makes brief appearances in later seasons.

Pegasus J. Crawford is his name in Japanese versions, while Maximillion Pegasus is his name in the VIZ Media-translated manga and in the anime.

An antagonist exclusive to the manga. He is the owner of the  game shop across the street from Sugoroku Mutou's Kame Game shop. Long ago, Mr. Otogi asked Sugoroku Muto, a master gamer, to take him in as a disciple. After a while, they challenged each other for the ownership of the Millennium Puzzle in a Shadow Game called the Devil's Board Game. Mr. Otogi, who lost, aged 50 years in a single night as a Penalty Game. Since then he desired revenge through his son Ryuji (known as Duke Devlin in the English anime). In the anime adaption, his character is excluded entirely. He makes an appearance in The Dark Side of Dimensions, a film set in the manga continuity, where he has opened up a cafe with Ryuji to replace of the burnt down Black Clown shop.

In the English Dungeon Dice Monsters video game, he is given the name Sindin the Clown.

The heir to a clan of tombkeepers and the younger brother of Ishizu Ishtar. Marik's hatred of the nameless Pharaoh compels him to disregard his duties and turn to a life of crime, as well as developing a split personality, during his childhood after he underwent the tombkeeper's initiation ritual (which burned a key to the Pharaoh's memory on his back with a hot dagger) and was forever destined for a confined life in the darkness apart from the rest of the world. After breaking one of the laws of their clan, his dark personality emerged and brutally murdered his father (sent him to the Shadow Realm in the English anime); however his adoptive older brother Rishid (known as Odion in the English version of the anime adaptation) managed to seal his dark side away, leaving him with no memory of his actions. He believed that the Pharaoh had his father killed and became obsessed with killing the Pharaoh to avenge his father and put an end to the suffering of his clan, never knowing about his other personality. To this end, he created the Rare Hunters, a gang of thieves who stole and collect rare Duel Monsters cards, and uses his Millennium Rod to control people's minds. Although he was originally innocent and kind as a child, he became very cruel and uncaring; killing his servants when they displeased him and developing a love for torturing people.

Dark Marik eventually is able to reemerge and take control of the normal Marik's body later on in the story and replaces him as the main antagonist. Dark Marik is the secondary antagonist of the series. He proves to be even more vicious than the original Marik. While the real Marik enjoyed violence and cruelty, he would only use it when he was angry or when it would further his own desires, but his dark side would attack anyone who crossed his path and would prolong their suffering for as long as possible; in the manga and Japanese Duel Monsters anime, he explicitly stated that he liked killing people because it was "fun" and "was the only thing that bought him happiness". He only cares for his own survival and actively tries to kill the normal Marik so he can have sole possession of their body. He also dislikes Rishid for sealing him away and actively tries to kill him too, although he keeps missing the chance. While he is connected to the Millennium Rod, Dark Marik differs from Dark Yugi and Dark Bakura in that he is an inhuman entity born from Marik Ishtar's pain and despair and can exist on his own without a host. (He explains that Dark Yugi would cease to exist if Yugi were destroyed, but the normal Marik's destruction wouldn't affect him.) Although not explicitly stated, it is hinted in the manga that he manipulated Marik into committing some of his later crimes, as he told Dark Yugi that he "took away" Marik's guilt for the things he did. Following Marik's surrender against Yugi, Dark Marik is destroyed.

Yako Tenma (天馬 夜行, Tenma Yakō)
The kōhai (protégé) and adopted son (often mistaken, or mistranslated as younger brother) of Maximillion Pegasus (Pegasus J. Crawford in the Japanese version) who wants revenge for Pegasus' defeat. 
  

The guardian of the Millennium Eye and the brother of King Ahknemkhanen. As they grew up, he was secretly jealous of his brother's position as pharaoh, considering himself the true power behind the throne. To protect his family from anyone seeking revenge, he abandoned his wife and his son, Seto. Seto later entered Pharaoh Atem's court as a priest, but Akhenaden kept their relationship a secret. Seeing how his son had flourished after he abandoned him, Akhenaden's desire became to see Seto achieve power.

In the manga, Akhenaden's soul is merged with Zorc's and sealed inside the Millennium Puzzle along with Atem, and released during the final arc. His mummy is then used as a second player on Dark Bakura's side of the Shadow RPG, influencing his own playing piece as the game's recreation of the events went on. When Atem wins the game, the mummy's skull is split in half, indicating that Zorc's soul has been vanquished for good.  In the second anime series, when Dark Bakura planted a portion of his soul into his Millennium Eye, Akhenaden's mind became corrupted. He would later collect the remaining items he created (in place of Dark Bakura who still uses freeze hourglass awhile) and granted him a power from Zorc by transforming into the High Priest of Darkness (Great Shadow Magus in the English dub). He would later seal the White Dragon just before he was killed by his own son Seto. As his soul would enter Seto's mind to kill the Pharaoh, this was stopped and killed for good by Kisara in her White Dragon form (Akhenaden was sent to the Shadow Realm afterwards). The purified soul of Akhenaden is later seen alongside his brother on the other side of the door to the afterlife when Atem walks through it.

A destroyer of worlds that was born from the darkness in humans' hearts (in the English anime dub, he is the creator of the Shadow Realm). He is summoned by Akhenaden by the power of the Millennium Items and attacks the kingdom, dispatching Atem's advisers. In the Memory World, an RPG-style Shadow Game that Dark Bakura has set up based on ancient Egypt, Zorc is the game's final boss and has three Ba gauges, and if Dark Yugi loses the Shadow RPG, Dark Bakura would gain the ultimate powers of darkness and Zorc would effectively be summoned once again. However, with the help of Yugi and his other dear friends, Atem defeats him and stops him from being resurrected, also freeing Bakura from the Millennium Ring once and for all. Dark Bakura was an entity made of both Zorc and Thief King Bakura's souls, and in the manga there is also an entity made of both Zorc and Priest Akhenaden's souls who calls himself Zorc Necrophades, High Priest of Darkness.

Minor antagonists

A deranged theme park created by Seto Kaiba in attempt to kill Yugi Mutou using deadly games, and hiring deadly opponents. These events do not happen in the second series anime.

Laser Tag Assassins
Three professional mercenaries hired by Kaiba. Being offered ¥10,000 each for killing Yugi and his friends in the  game, they were determined and were equipped with guns that fired real lasers that can cause fatal electric shocks, while Yugi and his friends were given toy guns.

A former Green Beret commander, who specialized in guerrilla warfare.

A former SWAT team leader and specialized in long distance sniping.

A former hitman that succeeded in killing of all his targets when he was hired by KaibaCorp.

The guide of the Horror Zone in Death T-2. Before the grand opening of Kaiba Land, he welcomed Yugi Mutou and Katsuya Jonouchi to Kaiba Manor. He, along with other servants, greet them and Mokuba when they arrived. Mokuba got him to prepare six meals, including two poisoned ones for his rigged game of Russian Roulette Dinner with Yugi and Jonouchi. When the game backfired and Mokuba was poisoned, the butler came to his aid.

A serial killer that is in one of the traps at Death-T and is exclusive to the manga. One summer, at a camp near Domino Lake, Chopman murdered ten boy scouts who had been staying there, in a single night. He chopped their bodies into unrecognizable pieces. The news of the murders had all of Domino City in fear. The suspect came to be known as "The Chopman", but was not captured and remained at large.

The right-hand man and butler of Pegasus. In the manga, he is taken hostage by Seto Kaiba, who punches him and holds Crocketts at gunpoint in the guestroom, threatening to snap Crocketts' neck in his briefcase if Pegasus doesn't show himself.

A character who is first shown working for the Kaiba Brothers as one of their private bodyguards during the Death-T arc. In actuality, he was working for Industrial Illusions the whole time, gathering information from within KaibaCorp and giving it to Pegasus. Saruwatari reappears in the Yu-Gi-Oh! R spin-off manga and makes an appearance in the 1999 movie, where he kidnaps unwilling invitees to Kaiba's tournament. Jonouchi stops him from forcing Shougo Aoyama to enter.

Duelists hired by Pegasus to challenge the contestants to duels and take their Star Chips, in order to ensure that the gamers on his island do not succeed in making it to the finals of Duelist Kingdom, and therefore making Pegasus the number one duelist in the world fit to be KaibaCorp's new CEO.

The first Player Killer that Yugi and his friends encounter is the hired by Saruwatari, whose primary job is to defeat Yugi. He controls a puppet that resembles Kaiba and uses his stolen deck. After being defeated, Dark Yugi inflicts the Penalty Game "Puppet Illusion" on him, trapping him in an illusion where a puppet of himself is attacking him.

An obese shape-shifter hired to defeat Yugi. He replaces the manga's Ventriloquist of the Dead in the Yu-Gi-Oh! Duel Monsters anime. Upon defeat, he vanishes after Dark Yugi uses a Mind Crush. In the English dub, he is the evil side of Seto Kaiba's heart that Dark Yugi banished to the Shadow Realm in the first episode.

The second Player Killer that the group encounters, who steals Mai's star chips. When Dark Yugi intends to bet his own life to even out stakes in order to win back Mai's star chips, this Player Killer ties a noose around Dark Yugi's neck, threatening to kill him once he wins. Because of this, Dark Yugi turns the duel into a Shadow Game, at one point, claiming he would win in five more turns. During the duel, Dark Yugi showed the Player Killer illusions of the impending Penalty Game, in which the Player Killer was walking up the gallows' stairs each turn closer to the five turn limit Dark Yugi claimed that he would win within. Once the Player Killer loses the Shadow Game, Dark Yugi inflicts the "Darkness of Naraku" Penalty Game on him, where the Player Killer imagines himself being hung from the gallows and galling into the abyss. In the anime, the penalty of the game is changed so that fire is shot at the loser. When the Player Killer attempts to do this to Dark Yugi even after losing, Dark Yugi's magic shields him from harm. He then performs a Mind Crush on the Player Killer. Mai's star chips are then returned to her.

The last set of Player Killers the group meet is within the underground maze of Duelist Kingdom who challenge Yugi and Jonouchi to a tag-battle game, a hybrid of Duel Monsters and a maze game. After losing, the group needed to choose the correct path, or else they would be stuck in the underground labyrinth for eternity. In reality, both doors are correct and the brothers are able to change the correct door at will. Their trickery is outed by Dark Yugi's  game, with the aid of Dark Bakura in the manga, and the groups heads on out to the surface.

A group of card thieves that serve Marik, referred to as "Ghouls of the Gaming Underworld" by Dark Yugi and Kaiba. By stealing and selling rare cards from duelists worldwide, the Ghouls provide Marik with a large supply of minions, rare cards and money. Numerous members of the Ghouls are shown, including the unnamed card shop owner and various other unnamed duelists.

 (English)
The first Ghoul who was informed by the card shop owner that gave Jonouchi his Duel Disk that Jonouchi owned the rare Red-Eyes Black Dragon. He uses a deck that only focuses on making a complete hand of counterfeit Exodia cards. After Dark Yugi manages to destroy his strategy and therefore win the entire duel, Marik uses his Millennium Rod to take over Rare Hunter's mind to introduce himself to Yugi, presumably killing Rare Hunter after.

The second Ghoul, who challenged Dark Yugi to a death game, in which their legs are shackled and buzzsaws threaten to saw off the loser's legs once their life points reach 0 (in the English anime, the loser will be sent to the Shadow Realm).  He is defeated by Yugi's Dark Magician Girl and as punishment, Marik probes his mind while he is unconscious to stir memories of the deaths of his mother and lover so that he commits suicide when he wakes up.

The third Ghoul, who first appeared before Bakura, Anzu, and Yugi's grandfather standing stationary in the park. Bakura tries to get his attention, stating in his head that he doesn't feel any life from him, as if he was a doll. He is later used a puppet by Marik to try and kill Yugi before Marik himself arrives in Battle City.

The last set of Ghouls who challenge Dark Yugi and Kaiba to a tag-team death game where the loser sets off a bomb near their side of the glass ceiling, falling 13 stories to their death (in the English anime, the loser will be sent to the Shadow Realm). Unbeknownst to Dark Yugi and Kaiba, they are equipped with parachutes.

The last set of Ghouls who challenge Dark Yugi and Kaiba to a tag-team death game where the loser sets off a bomb near their side of the glass ceiling, falling 13 stories to their death (in the English anime, the loser will be sent to the Shadow Realm). Unbeknownst to Dark Yugi and Kaiba, they are equipped with parachutes.

Filler antagonists

A rich, selfish, cold-hearted, uncaring and power-hungry tyrannical and powerful business man who is the adoptive father of Seto and Mokuba Kaiba. Gozaburo is the original founder and CEO of Kaiba Corporation, which initially began as a successful arms manufacturer, and a world famous chess champion.  It was this particular skill that Seto appealed to when Gozaburo visited the orphanage where he and Mokuba were living, as he challenged Gozaburo to a game of chess, with the stakes being the adoption of the two brothers. Seto won by cheating, and Gozaburo adopted Seto and Mokuba, but proved a cruel father, forcing Seto to spend all his time studying in order to groom him as his new heir. Gozaburo's plans backfired, however when he gave Seto a 2% share of Kaiba Corporation stock as a test, challenging him to pay back ten times the amount within a year. Seto managed to acquire the money within a single day, and together with the board of director, secured majority control of the company stocks, overthrowing Gozaburo and installing himself as the new CEO. Gozaburo commits suicide by defenestration upon being dethroned. In the first anime adaptation, he instead suffers a heart attack. In the Duel Monsters anime adaptation, his story is greatly altered, making him the major antagonist of one of the anime's filler arcs.

Gozaburo Kaiba's biological son, and Seto and Mokuba's stepbrother. He kidnaps Yugi and co. and traps them in his Virtual World. As the heir to Kaiba Corporation, Noah's father makes him study heavily in the arts and academic subjects, but unlike Seto Kaiba, Noah enjoys it and is eager to please his father. When Noah is approximately ten years old, he is in a car accident and is fatally injured. In the hope of saving his son, Gozaburo Kaiba uploads Noah's soul onto a supercomputer just before Seto is adopted.

The Big Five
Originally the executives for Kaiba Corp.
 Konosuke Oshita / Gansley

Former vice-president of business strategy at Kaiba Corp, he is the founder of the Big Five in which he is the oldest of the group. In the virtual world, his Deck Master was Deepsea Warrior.
 Shuzo Otaki / Adrian Randolph Crump III

Formerly a Kaiba Corp Personnel manager. In the dub, he used to be an accountant and the chief financial officer for Kaiba Corp. In the virtual world, his Deck Master was Penguin Nightmare. His position and deck master were based on his dream of an all penguin theme park that Kaiba hurt Crump by turning down.
 Chikuzen Oka / Johnson

Formerly an expert lawyer and chief legal officer for Kaiba Corp. In the virtual world, his Deck Master was Judge Man.
 Soichiro Ota / Nesbitt

Formerly an engineer and the chief technical officer at Kaiba Corp. In the virtual world, his Deck Master was Machine Sergeant. Ota hoped for revenge on Kaiba for forcing him to destroy his weapons to replace with video games.
 Kogoro Daimon / Lector

Formerly the right-hand man to Gozaburo and later, Seto Kaiba, who was next in line to become CEO of after Gozaburo. That was until Seto took his title and left Daimon little more than company consultant and figurehead. In the virtual world, his Deck Master is Android - Psycho Shocker.

Doma / Paradius
An organization who tried to take over the world using the Orichalcos.

The former King of Atlantis and the head of the organization Paradius. After being forced to kill his wife who had been turned into a monster by the orichalcos, Dartz was himself corrupted, turning his right eye green. Dartz led the forces of the Orichalcos against his father, daughter and the forces of the Dominion of the Beasts, but was defeated. Dartz then spent the next ten thousand years collecting souls to revive the Leviathan, which he felt could be easily revived using the soul of Atem.

The strongest of Dartz's henchmen and is the duelist meant to defeat Atem and Yugi Mutou. Rafael once had a family that was killed while on an ocean cruise, leaving him stranded on an island (in the English version, the family was still alive, but have completely forgotten about him). With only his dueling deck to keep him company, Raphael developed a deep bond with them before he was rescued.

Dartz's second henchman. Amelda lived in a town in the middle of a war as a child, leading a resistance group with his brother after their parents disappear (killed in the original). In the English dub, his brother disappeared (killed in the original) after their home town was attacked by soldiers armed by Gozaburo Kaiba, and Alister later sought revenge on his adopted son Seto.

Dartz's third henchman. Abandoned at a young age, Valon was cared for by a nun at a church and protected him from a local street gang. However, when the nun was killed in a fire and the church burned down, Valon assaulted the gang and was sent to juvenile prison (In the English Dub, Valon was sent there for an unspecified crime and the entire event at the church was completely omitted). In the English dub Valon finds and develops feelings for Mai, and seeks to defeat Jonouchi for previously defeating her and destroying her sense of worth as a duelist.

(
CEO of Schroeder Corp, a long-time rival to the Kaiba family and Kaiba Corporation. When Siegfried and Seto Kaiba become heads of their respective family companies, both of them attempt to create holographic systems for Duel Monsters. Both succeed, with Siegfried's invention being the Holographic Duel Box Room System, but Kaiba markets and patents his first, leaving Siegfried to fall into ruin. He actively attempted to destroy Kaiba Corp for many years afterwards. After discovering that his younger brother Leon was secretly a successful duelist, he took an interest in him for the first time and manipulated him to use his talents to destroy Kaiba. Siegfried joins the KC Grand Prix to discredit Kaiba and claim revenge. Although Siegfried uses a variety of computer viruses to attempt to destroy Kaiba Corporation's computer systems, Kaiba is able to halt them all and expels Siegfried from the tournament. When his brother faces Yugi in the finals, he further attempts to use him to destroy Kaiba Corp, but once again fails, as his brother didn't want to beat anyone by cheating. After his failure, as he is kneeling on the ground sobbing, Leon approaches his brother and forgives him and promises to help rebuild their family's company and Siegfried embraces him, finally able to have a real relationship with his little brother.

Film antagonists

The main antagonist of Yu-Gi-Oh! The Movie: Pyramid of Light, who was sealed inside the titular artifact. He wants revenge on Yami Yugi and awakens after Yugi Muto solves the Millennium Puzzle. Pharaoh Atem had defeated Anubis a long time ago, yet Anubis reappears to face Yugi Muto. Anubis possesses the cards Andro Sphinx and Sphinx Teleia, which can be merged into Theinen the Great Sphinx. In the Japanese version of the movie, Anubis wants revenge by using the King of Light (Kaiba) to defeat the King of Darkness (Yami Yugi) in order to revive Anubis, the King of Destruction, and then use Kaiba to become the new king and rule the world. However his plan is cut short by Yugi and he is finally killed by Blue-Eyes Shining Dragon.

The main antagonist of Yu-Gi-Oh! 3D: Bonds Beyond Time. One of Iliaster's Four Stars of Destruction, he is a Turbo Duelist who travels across time and space to destroy the history of Duel Monsters in order to save his own time, but ends up causing more damage to the time-line than expected. He faces Yugi Muto, Jaden Yuki and Yusei Fudo in a duel and is defeated by them, saving their timelines. He also appears in a flashback in Yu-Gi-Oh! 5D's.

 

The antagonist of Yu-Gi-Oh!: The Dark Side of Dimensions, a film that serves as an epilogue to the manga continuity. Diva lived in Egypt with his sister, Sera, and with Mani. They were connected to Shadi, as Shadi had played a mentor-like role in their lives. In the Shrine of the Underworld. Shadi taught them about the Millennium Items, that three of the items were prone to evil, three represented justice, and the seventh (the Millennium Puzzle) contained both justice and evil. Shadi considered Diva to be of the same level as the person who is destined to solve the Millennium Puzzle. Shadi told them that when the seven items are gathered together, a door to a better world would be opened and that the three of them could enter that world, because they had been chosen. Using the mystical artifacts's great power, Diva can transport people to an alternate dimension, where they will gradually dissolve into nothingness or he can use it to erase people directly.

In the present day, he altered the memories of everyone in Domino City, implanting the notion that he was a new student at Domino High School named . He plans to kill Seto Kaiba and Yugi Muto to save the dimension he comes from, and also wants revenge on Ryo Bakura, whom he blamed for Shadi's death.

Recurring characters

The grandfather of Yugi Mutou, who gave him his famous Millennium Puzzle as a present, which he had recovered from the tomb of Pharaoh Atem in his youth. He was once a gaming master who traveled all over the world to try all sorts of games and win them all, vowing that if he ever lost a game, he'd "open up a game shop, wear overalls, and collect years instead of chips". In the present, he's an overall-wearing old man who owns a game shop called Kame Game, where Yugi and his friends get several of the games they play. In the second series anime adaptation, he taught Katsuya Jonouchi how to play the Duel Monsters card game. Similar to his grandson, his fondness for games is evident even in his name: "Sugoroku" is a Japanese game similar to Backgammon. Sugoroku is the reincarnation of Ancient Egyptian vizier, Siamun Muran, right-hand man to the Pharaoh Atem.

According to his father, Mr. Otogi (or better known as "Mr. Clown"), Ryuji was born and raised as a brilliant games player in order to fulfill his father's revenge on Sugoroku Mutou. Sugoroku had defeated Mr. Otogi in a Shadow Game called the Devil's Board Game, causing him to age 50 years in one night as a Penalty Game. Ryuji was transferred to Domino High School, where Yugi Mutou (Sugoroku's grandson) goes to school. His father used this as an opportunity for Ryuji to defeat Yugi in a series of games and fulfill the family's revenge, taking the Millennium Puzzle for himself. Unfortunately for Mr. Clown, Ryuji ends up being moved by the games he had with Yugi and cannot bring himself to hate him, ultimately rejecting his father's revenge and eventually joining Yugi's circle of friends. He is somewhat serious and quiet, but also level headed and very intelligent.

In the second anime, the influence of Ryuji's father is omitted entirely and Ryuji's personality is rewritten. Instead, it is explained that Ryuji befriended Pegasus, who became fond of ), and wanted to help him market the game. Following his defeat by Yugi, Ryuji's idol is no longer interested in their earlier deal. Angry and bitter, he blames Yugi and believes he cheated in his match against Pegasus. After learning the truth, he befriends Yugi and the others and will often join them on their adventures. Despite his arrogance and being one of the more negative, sarcastic members of the group, he is still fairly smart and level headed. His personality often causes conflict with Honda, especially over Shizuka, who they both have a crush on in the anime.

The first Millennium Item wielder to cause trouble for Yugi and his friends in the series. His origin differs between mediums. In the final story arc, it is revealed that he is a spirit from the afterlife, bound to the Millennium Stone and constantly reincarnating to guard it until the Pharaoh returns. The physical body of his current incarnation was destroyed by Dark Bakura several years ago.

Marik's elder sister. Ishizu became a museum curator in order to lure Yugi Muto and Seto Kaiba to her in order to keep Marik from fulfilling his goals. To aid her, she holds the  that has the power to foresee events in the near future. Despite her brother's betrayal of their family, she still loves him very much and believes that there is still good in his heart. she continued to seek a way to return him to the person he used to be, even as he became more cruel. She is committed to her family's destiny to serve the pharaoh, as she believes that he is the only one with the power to stop Marik.

Marik's adoptive brother and the second-in-command of the Ghouls. Abandoned as a child, Rishid was taken in by Marik's mother prior to his birth. However, his father never accepted him as a suitable heir and treated him as a servant rather than a son. Despite this, Rishid had always desire to become a true part of the family and an heir to the tombkeeper clan. When Marik was born, his mother told him to take care of his younger brother and Rishid stood by Marik's side, even when he turned to a life of evil. Marik and Rishid were close siblings, but Rishid always harbored a resentment for him as the true heir to the tombkeeper's clan and legitimate son of his parents. When Marik was bitten by a cobra and became ill, their father beat Rishid, furious he allowed Marik to be harmed, and ordered that he not leave Marik's bedside until he recovered. Rishid takes a dagger to Marik's room with the intent to kill him in his sleep (this is edited out in the dub, along with Rishid's resentment for Marik). Marik awakens and murmurs "brother", causing Rishid to drop the weapon in shock: Marik sees Rishid as his brother, despite the fact they are not blood related. When Marik admitted that he was terrified of being forced to take the initiation ritual, he tried unsuccessfully to stop their father from forcing it on him. When that failed, he scarred his own face with a dagger in order to share the pain and prove his loyalty to their family. When Marik unknowingly developed his dark split personality, Rishid was the only one who could restrain Dark Marik and protected Marik from ever knowing about the existence of his dark side and the crimes it had committed. Once, after he helped Marik and Ishizu sneak outside, his father attempted to kill him for betraying them. When Marik returned and witnessed this, his anger allowed Dark Marik to take over and murder his father (or send him to the Shadow Realm, in the English anime) but Rishid was still alive and was able to calm Marik down and make his dark side disappear again, lying to him that Shadi (who appeared afterwards) had killed him under orders from the Pharaoh to protect him from the truth.

An attractive woman who spent most of her life alone. While working as a blackjack dealer on a cruise ship, she developed a cynical attitude towards people and showed no shame in manipulating men, who displayed foolish infatuation towards her and previously used her "Aroma Tactics" to easily beat them in card games. Although she made a lot of money doing this, it caused her to hate people more until she got sick of her job and quit. She became a powerful, successful duelist thanks to her Harpie-themed deck. However, Mai had no true friends, and dueled simply for pride and monetary gain, but also entered the Duelist Kingdom tournament to find the things she used to cherish.  When Mai joins the Duelist Kingdom tournament to seek the prize money, she meets Yugi Mutou and his friends and steadily forges a true friendship with them after they rescue her Star Chips from the Player Killer of Darkness to help her stay in the tournament. Mai subsequently faces Yugi in the semi-finals, but ultimately chooses to surrender to him when she decides she could not win, telling him that some losses only serve to make people stronger. In the second anime, she was raised in a wealthy household, but was barely acknowledged by her relatives.

In the 4Kids version, Mai's past as a blackjack dealer was omitted and both she and her Harpie Ladies' appearance were censored to remove sexual references. Her 4Kids name is a reference to "my valentine".

 / 

The little sister of Katsuya Jonouchi, separated from him when their parents divorced and her mother took custody of her. When Shizuka was diagnosed with the steady onset of blindness, Jonouchi entered the Duelist Kingdom tournament and successfully obtained the prize money to secure the operation that would save her eyesight. She has a different surname from her brother in the manga and Japanese second anime, but the same surname in the first anime.

A character created exclusively for Yu-Gi-Oh! Duel Monsters. She is the bratty 8-year-old (12 in the Japanese version) granddaughter of a friend of Sugoroku Mutou, believing Sugoroku stole the Blue-Eyes White Dragon card from him. Dueling Sugoroku's grandson Yugi to get it back, Rebecca and Yugi play a game identical to the one Sugoroku played with Rebecca's grandfather years ago. After Yugi surrenders, Sugoroku explains that Seto Kaiba tore her Blue-Eyes White Dragon in half after beating him in a duel. After learning the truth, Rebecca apologizes to Sugoroku for thinking he tore it instead. Yugi then hands Rebecca the "Ties of Friendship" card that he won at Duelist Kingdom as a token of his acceptance of her forgiveness for her foolishness. She later appears as one of the contestants for the KC Grand Prix. By this time, she has given up the teddy bear she carried around with her, in addition to growing out her hair and getting glasses. She is also shown to be quite intelligent, as she has already enrolled in college, but is still immature and self-centered. She has been shown to have a large, undisguised crush on Yugi, as shown by how she always wants to hold his hand and calls him her 'darling', which often makes Anzu unhappy, although the two are still good friends regardless.

Millennium World

The  protect the seven Millennium Items with their lives and have to swear eternal loyalty to the Pharaoh, Atem (serving as the player character of Dark Yugi, Atem's spirit in modern times). In the age where Shadow Games were used to determine a person's fate, these Priests used the Millennium Items and sorcery to pull out and seal human souls (Ka), which take the form of Monsters Spirits, into stone slabs to do battle; usually from criminals and those who pilfer from the tombs of the Pharaohs. Within the RPG, each characters' health and magic were represented by their Ba Gauge.

One of the six High Priests that guard the Millennium Items and is the holder of the Millennium Rod, Seto is both Atem's cousin and a past life of Seto Kaiba. While he possesses Kaiba's basic attitude, Seto bear a great loyalty and friendship to Atem. Before the Battle City arc, a tablet showing Priest Seto fighting Pharaoh Atem was on display at the Domino City Museum, with Blue-Eyes White Dragon fighting against the Pharaoh's Dark Magician. During Battle City, Kaiba continuously has vivid visions of his past life as Seto. Priest Seto appears as an NPC in the Shadow RPG, aligned to Yami Yugi's side of the board.

A loyal High Priest of Pharaoh Atem's court and appears as an NPC within Dark Bakura's Shadow RPG, the previous owner of the Millennium Ring before losing it to Thief King Bakura in a Shadow Game. He states that he had sensed an evil intelligence within the Millennium Ring, which it absorbed from the previous priest who wore it.

A loyal priestess that serves Pharaoh Atem in Ancient Egypt and wields the Millennium Necklace, Isis is revealed to be Ishizu Ishtar's previous life. She is named after the Egyptian goddess Isis.

One of the six High Priests that served under Pharaoh Atem in Ancient Egypt 3,000 years ago during his reign (5,000 years ago in the English anime), and was the owner of the Millennium Scales at the time. He appears as an NPC aligned with Yami Yugi in the Shadow RPG.

One of the six priests that guarded Pharaoh Atem 3,000 years ago and appears as an NPC in the Shadow RPG. He is the keeper of the Millennium Key during Atem's reign. He appears to have a friendship with Priest Seto, and although he was reluctant, Shada aided Seto in his criminal hunt for Monster Spirit Ka with his Millennium Key. He later dies after pushing Atem out of the way of a lightning bolt caused by Zorc Necrophades, having his Ba Gauge wiped out (in the English version of the second anime, he is sent to the Shadow Realm). After his death, Siamun, his predecessor, took back the Millennium Key in order to call forth Exodia the Forbidden One. Although he is the wielder of the Millennium Key and has a similar name to Shadi, the two are not related in any way.

A vizier of Pharaoh Atem. He resembles Yugi's modern day grandpa, Sugoroku Mutou. He was originally one of the Pharaoh Akhenamkhanen's original guardians and was the former keeper of the Millennium Key, the predecessor to Shada.

A childhood friend of Atem and studies magic under Mahad as his apprentice. She is a light-hearted, open, playful and caring girl, who shares a deep bond between her master and Atem. The anime shows all three were childhood friends. She appears in the Millennium World arc as an NPC during Dark Bakura's Shadow RPG game. Her Ka is the Dark Magician Girl. In the second anime, she can see Atem's friends from the present and initially mistakes Yugi for Atem.

The keeper of the Blue Eyes White Dragon Monster Spirit in the Millennium World arc. Her pale appearance is unusual, and she is mentioned as being from a "foreign country" in the Japanese anime. In the second series anime adaptation, it's stated that as children, Priest Seto saved Kisara from slave traders, and she repaid him by unconsciously releasing her inner dragon spirit after the traders set fire to his village and killed his mother. Years later (their first meeting in the manga), Seto again stumbles across Kisara being stoned because of her pale white skin, deep blue eyes and snow white hair. Shada senses the immeasurably strong strength and power within her — which he deems "equal to that of the [Egyptian] Gods" — and Seto takes her back to the palace, where he recognizes her as the girl he once saved some years ago. Kazuki Takahashi has said that he originally planned for the story to have much further explored the strong romantic relationship between Seto and Kisara, but in order to meet a deadline these details had to be cut. According to Takahashi, Priest Seto's strong romantic feelings for Kisara are the main basis behind Kaiba's modern-day unusually strong obsession with the Blue-Eyes White Dragon card.

In the manga, he is a member of an Egyptian tombkeeper clan that protects the Millennium Items under the command of Shadi. He has Shadi's Millennium Scale as well as his Millennium Key. Bobasa protects the items by placing them on his abnormally-shaped chest and locking his clothes. He then swallows the key, and is able to regurgitate it at will. He accompanied Yugi and his friends into the Millennium Puzzle's maze, a continuation of the Labyrinth Treasure Hunt from the early manga, in order to find the true door to the king's memory. He later enters the Memory World with Yugi and his friends and becomes an NPC in the Shadow RPG. In the manga, it is revealed that he is actually Hasan, which in turn, means that he is actually Shadi.

In the Duel Monsters anime version, his role and character are completely altered. Bobasa appears as a comic relief NPC that inhabits the Shadow RPG. He is a key switch that can lead the player to where the Pharaoh's name is if the player gives him enough food to eat. It is never fully explained to who and what he actually is, but it's implied that he could have been a genie or some other supernatural entity because he said that now that he's full, he can "grant your wish." When he finally took them to the Pharaoh's tomb, he vanished and seemed to know a lot more about the situation then he was first implied to. Unlike the manga, Bobasa is not an alternate identity of Shadi.

Other characters

()
A hall monitor at Domino High School who offers a paid bully protection service to Yugi after he is bullied by Jonouchi and Honda. Although Yugi refuses, denying that he has been bullied, Ushio beats up Jonouchi and Honda and demands that Yugi pay him a fee of 20,000 yen. Ushio ends up being the first victim of Dark Yugi's Shadow Games, suffering a Penalty Game upon defeat that causes him to become insane, thinking that garbage and leaves are money. He also appears in Yu-Gi-Oh! 5D's.

A minor villain exclusive to the original manga, appearing in the second chapter. After he used Yugi for a bullying scene, and he beat up Jonouchi, Dark Yugi challenged him to shadow game. He lost, and Yugi made it so everything he sees is cencored.

A friend of Yugi in the early chapters of the manga, and does not appear in either anime series. He becomes friends with Yugi after Dark Yugi defeats Sozoji, who until that point was bullying him, in a Shadow Game. Tomoya is obsessed with the American superhero, . Before the start of the series, Hanasaki spent some time in hospital. When his father comes to visit, he gave Tomoya a Zombire figure, telling him that this is Zombire and he is the strongest hero in America. Holding the figure, Hanasaki says he feels stronger too. His father is delighted to hear this and promised to bring him more Zombire toys and figures every time he came home from America.

A karaoke player who tries to get people to listen to his horrid singing. He is a minor villain exclusive to the original manga. Sozoji forced Yugi and Tomoya Hanasaki to sell tickets to his All Night Solo Live Show. When Yugi discovers that Hanasaki has also asked to sell tickets, Yugi offers to take charge of selling all the tickets so only one of them would have to suffer. Sozoji discovers the exchange and beats-up Hanasaki. Yugi arrives at the show, not having sold any tickets. Sozoji then forces Yugi to listen to his music at a deafening volume and brings out Hanasaki, who was badly beaten, as the audience for the next act. In Rage, Dark Yugi challenged him to a Shadow Game, and his penalty game was making him hear his own heart beat at deafening volumes.

A convict who escaped from Domino City Jail with a stolen handgun after killing a guard. In the first series anime, he is called  and is actually the manager of the Burger World restaurant (differing in appearance with his manga counterpart), framing Tetsu Sasaki. In the Manga, Yugi challenged him to a Shadow Game, and set him on fire. In the Anime, he was put in an illusion where he was set on fire, and was arrested.

A character from the 1998 anime and a common thief who resembles the manga's Prisoner Number 777. He is framed by Jiro the Spider for killing a guard with a stolen handgun.

A character that appears in the manga and 1998 anime. He is a self-proclaimed psychic in Class 1-A of Domino High School. Kokurano predicted a fellow student's house would catch fire. The prediction came true three weeks later, causing Kokurano to become famous at school. In actuality, Kokurano himself had set the student's house on fire. In the first anime, Kokurano has a slight dislike for Miho Nosaka because she will not get a prediction from him, for, in his words, she "mocks life with her complete innocence". After he tried to make Yugi a victim of his "predictions", and knocked Anzu out with Chloroforms, Dark Yugi challenged him to a Shadow Game, and challenged him to a Shadow Game. He was knocked out, and by morning, his false predictions where revealed.

A minor villain exclusive to the original manga. He was the senior class D festival committee president of Domino City High. He trashed Yugi's festival stand, and was Challedged to play "Ice Griddle Hockey". He was defeated, and was engulfed in an explosion as punishment.

A classmate of Yugi and his friends, the shy student librarian of the school, nicknamed "Ribbon" for the yellow ribbon she wears in her hair. She has only a small role in the original manga, where Hiroto Honda has a crush on her and attempts to pass a love note to her in the form of a jigsaw puzzle. The puzzle is intercepted by the evil wicked teacher Miss Chono, but her attempts to embarrass Honda are foiled by Dark Yugi. Unfortunately, when Honda asks Miho out directly, she turns him down flat. Despite this, Honda becomes friends with Yugi, eventually joining the group.

An evil teacher, and a mean and nasty villain from the manga and first series anime. Her beautiful appearance is due to the immensely thick layer of make-up she wears, which covers her true, ugly face. She also enjoys dating, but the part she likes the best was to dump the men to see them cry and she actually considers it to be a hobby. After she nearly expelled Honda, Yugi made her face a penalty game where her true ugly face was revealed to her whole class.

A minor villain exclusive to the manga. He was a character who tried to con Jonouchi out of a pair of Air Muscle shoes he bought. After Yugi Mutou found out about the owner's con, he changed to Dark Yugi and confronted the owner. The owner did not want Yugi to leave the store, knowing his secret, so he hid his scorpion in one of the shoes as he gave it back, hoping to poison Dark Yugi. Instead, he was challenged to a shadow game, and was stung by his own scorpion.

The leader of a gang of extortion committing teenage thugs from Rintama High School and an old associate of Jonouchi. During middle school, Hirutani hung out with Katsuya Jonouchi as part of a gang, who would spend their time picking fights with gangs from other schools, even high schools. After middle school, Hirutani went to Rintama High School, while Jonouchi went to Domino High School. His personality got worse, and he blackmailed Jonouchi into joining him, but he was defeated by Dark Yugi.

The curator of Domino City Museum, who exhibited the Millennium Puzzle after Yugi Mutou agrees to let him exhibit it for one day.

A Domino University professor who is into archaeology and a friend of Sugoroku Mutou. Yoshimori has a wife and son, but neglected them in favor of his work. In the 1998 series, he does not take part in Shadi's Shadow Game, and is instead thrown out of the museum window and hospitalized.

A snobby classmate of Yugi's at Domino High School in the manga and 1998 anime. He causes trouble with his aggressive , named Devil Master in the 1998 series. In the 1998 series, Kujirada was bullied and manipulated by Haiyama. After losing to Honda's Digital Pet, Haiyama punishes Kujirada by whipping him. Dark Yugi saves Honda, Miho, and Kujirada by challenging Haiyama to a Digital Pet Shadow Game.

Kujirada's bully in the 1998 series.

A boy who beat up Yugi over a losing streak of Virtual VS with both of them using the character of Bruce Ryu (based on their favorite Hong Kong movies martial artist, Bruce Lee), stealing his Millennium Puzzle. Jonouchi found out cantonese films what happened afterwards and chased down the street fighter to get back the Puzzle. They fought in the Street Fighter's game, "One-Inch Terror" but was beaten by Jonouchi.

A manga-exclusive character, who is Honda's baby nephew, the son of his big sister. A big fan of Seto Kaiba, he forces Honda to take him to the opening of Kaiba, where Honda witnesses Yugi's grandfather being dealt an artificial Penalty Game by Kaiba and decides to accompany Yugi in Kaiba's Death-T challenge. Johji is recognizable for wearing a duck costume. The baby, an admirer of Kaiba, is lecherous towards Anzu and other females which is played for comedy relief, and spews curse words at times. He calls Honda by his given name, Hiroto, and seems to dislike him and his male friends. He accompanies the group during the Death-T arc and actually proves to be somewhat helpful in a couple of Kaiba's deadly attractions, if not a bit treacherous and a burden.

The guidance counselor of Domino High School and a minor villain exclusive to the manga. He tends to abuse his position as a teacher to be unfair to the students. Tsuruoka mocked the low achievement test grades of Yugi, Jonouchi, and Honda to their peers as punishment for playing the Achievement Test Bingo Game while having low test scores. Tsuruoka then snatched the  keychain Anzu had given to Yugi as a gift, from Yugi's pocket, citing that students are not allowed to bring games to school.

A selfish corrupt executive of the television studio, ZTV. He takes advantage of underprivileged people to boost ratings and cheats his way out of giving away prize money. He was a producer of the TV game show, . He was pleased to find out that Katsuya Jonouchi, who was poor and trying to pay off his father's gambling debts, would be on the show. He thought that the audience would love to see a poor person struggling, and would love it even more to see him fail at the last minute. He and a technician tried to rig the final stage of the game, to prevent Jonouchi winning the prize money. This was to be done by pressing a button, which would prevent the wheel in the final game from stopping on the ¥1,000,000 section. The button was colored red to distinguish it from the other buttons on the switchboard. Dark Yugi's attempt to punish him ends up backfiring and Jonouchi did not get the prize money regardless.

A minor villain first appearing in the original manga. In the manga, Nagumo asks Yugi to play  with him while at Domino High School. While playing, Nagumo hits Yugi and takes his gun and monster, Alti. Nagumo tries selling Alti and other Monster Fighter figures and guns he has collected for ¥30,000 each. Dark Yugi comes into his store and fights Nagumo and his Wild Spider with Katsuya Jonocuhi's monster, Killer Emaada (which the normal Yugi had asked to borrow before handing control over to Dark Yugi). As the game was a Shadow Game, Nagumo's face was cracked in the first set, which went to Dark Yugi; the Shadow Game dictated that the players, instead of the monsters, get damaged in the game. In the second set, Nagumo cheats by kicking Dark Yugi in the side. Enraged, Dark Yugi raised the Shadow Game's mode to "level three". When Nagumo tries to cheat again, his legs are held down by all of the monsters, including his own, and Nagumo saw, to his horror, the monster on his field was his own soul, composed of the Wild Spider's body, but his own face. Dark Yugi then dealt the death blow, piercing the representation of Nagumo's soul, purging it of the darkness. He also competes in the Battle City tournament, but his time in the tournament is short as he is decimated by Kaiba's God Card.

Playing Card Bomber (English manga) /  (1998 anime) /  (Japanese manga)

A nickname for a man who sets off a string of bombs in Domino. The bomber's third attack at the Domino Mall kills eight people. His fourth bomb threat puts Anzu's life in danger. In the manga, Dark Yugi saves her life by playing  without getting four threes. Afterwards, Dark Yugi reveals where the bomber was to the chief of police, leading to his arrest. In the Anime, Dark Yugi made him face a penalty game where he thought there was a bomb in the car he was hiding.

A student at Domino High School. Withdrawn and somewhat shy, Imori is then revealed to be anti-social and selfishly vindicated (akin to being Yugi's own evil counterpart), eventually uncovering the secrets of Yugi's Millennium Puzzle. He was defeated, and had his soul sucked out, where it would be food for the game. In the 1998 anime only the darkness is sucked out.

A boy with buckteeth that uses a sob story about him getting hit by yo-yos in a robbery to lure Yugi and Jonouchi to Hirutani. Nezumi tells Jonouchi that three gang members ambushed him, beat him up, and stole his yo-yo. Out of anger, Jonouchi asks Nezumi to lead him to the gangsters. Yugi and Jonouchi travel to Hirutani's abandoned warehouse, where scores of gang members ambush the two boys. Nezumi runs away when Yugi and Jonouchi manage to defeat the gang members. He only appears in the manga.

A P.E. teacher who harasses Ryo Bakura on his first day at Domino High School. Karita saw him walking through the hallways with an (unwanted) group of girls. He angrily pulled Bakura aside and recognized him as the new student, who has caused problems in his last school. Insistent on disciplining him, he yelled at Bakura that this school has rules and seized him by the hair, saying that boys with long hair is against the rules. He ordered Bakura to have his hair shaved for the next day if he wants to be treated as a student, and walked off laughing. Dark Bakura put his soul in a game piece.

The former Japanese champion of Duel Monsters, known for his deck of mainly insect-type monsters and insect-related magic and trap cards. Haga is not above cheating to ensure his strategies work; he befriended Yugi only to throw his Exodia cards into the oceans and put a Paracitic Insect card in Jonouchi's deck to ensure his Insect Barrier would work.

The runner-up of the Japanese Duel Monsters tournament, and seems to be acquainted with the champion, Insector Haga. His nickname is derived  from his fondness for dinosaur-themed deck of cards. However, Ryuzaki is defeated by Jonouchi in the Duelist Kingdom tournament and has his Red-Eyes Black Dragon, a card that would become a trademark for Jonouchi, taken as a result of a gamble. Rex makes a brief reappearance in the Battle City arc, having been defeated by the pseudo psychic, Espa Roba, warning Jonouchi not to duel him.

An ocean-themed duelist appearing both in the Duelist Kingdom and Battle City arcs. Introduced in the Duelist Kingdom arc, he duels Dark Yugi and is defeated. In Battle City, he duels Katsuya Jonouchi, and his backstory is further expanded. It is revealed that Ryota's father was a great fisherman that was lost at sea. Ryota Kajiki is the first opponent of Dark Yugi who challenges him game with no ill intentions. In the English anime, Mako Tsunami believes his father is alive and duels to raise money to fund a trip to search for him; in the manga and Japanese second anime, Ryota Kajiki duels in his father's memory. Jonouchi defeats Ryota in their duel. Then Ryota gives Jonouchi two of his cards, Floating Whale Fortress and The Legendary Fisherman, a card which resembles his deceased father.

Nicknamed as Bandit Keith, is an American Duel Monsters champion and a "Card Professor", hunting big prizes at tournaments. Keith first appears as one of many entries in the Duelist Kingdom arc of the anime/manga. In flashbacks, it is revealed that he was once the champion of Duel Monsters in America, until he dueled Pegasus at the American Championship tournament (taking place some time before the Death-T arc of the manga). Keith, shocked and humiliated at being defeated, became depressed over the defeat and seeks to defeat Pegasus and reclaim his lost glory. It is through Pegasus' match with Keith that Kaiba found out about Pegasus' ability to read minds. After he cheats in his duel against Jonouchi in the Duelist Kingdom semi-finals, Pegasus inflicts the "Hand and Gun" Penalty Game on him, turning his hand into a gun and forcing him to play Russian Roulette, effectively killing Keith. In the anime, Pegasus instead sends him through a trap door into the ocean. He survives when he is picked up by Marik Ishtar's ship, with Marik then controlling his mind and using him in his first attempt to defeat Yugi and take the Millennium Puzzle.

A contestant in Duelist Kingdom who worked for Bandit Keith. Keith was responsible for giving Kozuka some cards to enhance his zombie deck in order to duel Jonouchi in Duelist Kingdom's caverns, which housed the corpses of World War II troops. Ultimately, Kozuka loses to Jonouchi. Following this loss, after sealing Yugi and his friends in a cave, he has his Star Chips stolen by Bandit Keith and presumably is sent off the island. He returns during Battle City later in the story, but is defeated and presumably killed by Dark Bakura in a Shadow Game (Kozuka is presumably sent to Hell by Dark Bakura in Yu-Gi-Oh! Duel Monsters), but is later rescued from it by his defeat in Battle City along with everyone else sent to that dimension.

In the manga, Johnny challenged Anzu to the dance battle game. Although Dark Yugi told Anzu that this gamer is not worth her time, she refused to back down from a challenge and went up against Johnny. Johnny said he would go easy on her because she is hot, and said she would have to go on a date with him if he loses. Anzu refuses, but plays anyway and defeats him. In the Yu-Gi-Oh! Duel Monsters anime, this story is expanded by having Johnny insist on going on a date with him after the encounter in the arcade, ending up in a Duel Monsters duel with Dark Yugi.

One of the contestants in Battle City who claimed to have ESP. In reality, he is a fraud who uses his younger brothers to spy on and reply back to him the cards in his opponent's hand, thus allowing him to 'predict' the opponent's strategies almost before they perform them. The psychic front was to build an impression of an unbeatable duelist and thus deflect any abuse usually heaped upon Esper Roba and his brothers; they were heavily bullied due to being carnival folk before. Despite his cheating ways, he is a strong duelist. However, Jonouchi manages to beat him, receiving his best card as an ante, .

One of the two men hired to help Sugoroku Mutou through the Pharaoh's tomb, the Shrine of the Shadow Games, back in the early 1960s. In the tomb, Sugoroku soon realized that the traps were like a game. Multiple statues armed with swords slide by on the high catwalk. To cross, a person needed to walk across left footed, and if they ran on both legs, the statues would kill them. Unfortunately, the two brothers were right footed. Ahmet makes it to safety, while his brother panicked and started running. The statues soon stabbed his brother with their swords, causing him to fall to his death (in the English dub, he fell into a Shadow Pit and became trapped in the Shadow Realm). Ahmet pulled a gun on Sugoroku, blaming him for his brother's death, and threatened to shoot if they did not continue. They soon made it to the treasure, where only those of courageous hearts may pass. Ahmet shoots Sugoroku, causing him to fall and grab onto one of the catwalk's ledges. Ahmet walked over to the Millennium Puzzle, but proved to have a heart of a coward, and a monster appeared and devoured him alive as a Penalty Game.

One of the two men hired to help Sugoroku Mutou through the Pharaoh's tomb, the Shrine of the Shadow Games, back in the early 1960s. In the tomb, Sugoroku realized that the traps were like a game. Multiple statues armed with swords slide by on the high catwalk. To cross, a person needed to walk across left footed, and if they if ran on both legs the statues would kill them. Unfortunately, the two brothers are right footed. His brother Ahmet makes it to safety, but Mushara panicked and started running. The statues stabbed Mushara with their swords, causing him to fall to his death. In the English dub, he fell into a Shadow Pit and became trapped in the Shadow Realm.

A character who appears in the 1999 movie as one of the main protagonists. He was a boy who did not play games with his friends because he was afraid of losing, and was regularly bullied by a group of three boys. One day, at a card shop, he opens a card pack containing the rare "Red-Eyes Black Dragon" card. However, he is too timid to pull a winning streak, and once he gets the Red-Eyes, he resorts to simply intimidating people with it so they will not duel him.

A character that only appears in Yu-Gi-Oh! Duel Monsters and the grandfather of Rebecca Hawkins. He appears to be based on Sugoroku's American gaming friend that gave him the Blue-Eyes White Dragon card, who only appears in a photo and is unnamed in the original manga.

A character created exclusively for the KC Grand Champion filler arc of Yu-Gi-Oh! Duel Monsters. He is Siegfried von Schroeder's younger brother.

References

External links

 Yu-Gi-Oh! Duel Monsters cast(遊 戯 王 声 優 情 報) 
 Yu-Gi-Oh! characters
 List of Yu-Gi-Oh! characters

Lists of anime and manga characters